Burnin' Down the House: Live at the House of Blues is the third live album by Etta James and her twenty-eighth album overall, released in 2002. The album reached a peak position of number one on Billboard Top Blues Albums chart.

A few of the cover songs on this album were also featured on some of James' past albums: Leave Your Hat On was on Etta James (1973), Your Good Thing Is About To End was on Stickin' to My Guns (1990), Rock Me Baby was on a previous live album Etta, Red-Hot & Live.

Track listing

References

2002 live albums
Albums recorded at the House of Blues
Etta James albums
Private Music albums